I'm Not Lying But I'm Beautifying, also known as The Made Up Truth (Egyptian Arabic: أنا لا أكذب ولكني أتجمل German: Die geschminkte wahrheit translit: Ana La Aktheb Wlakenani Atajaml), is 1981 Egyptian film written by Ihsan Abdel Quddous and directed by Ibrahim El-Shaqanqeeri. The film stars Salah Zulfikar, Ahmed Zaki and Athar El-Hakim.

Plot 
Rafik Hamdy is a famous writer, who has one daughter, Khairya, a college student. Her colleague Ibrahim, the diligent student, falls in love with her and she also exchanges love, although the rich student Hani admires her, Ibrahim tries to hide the truth of his social level for fear that Khairiya will move away from him, to claim that he is from a wealthy family. But eventually, Rafik knows the truth and confronts Ibrahim and now Khairia must choose.

Main cast 

 Salah Zulfikar as Rafik Hamdy
 Ahmed Zaki as Ibrahim
 Athar El-Hakim as Khairia
 Zahrat El-Ola as Nadia
 Nahed Samir as Mobrouka
 Farouk Youssef as Hani
 Maha Abu Ouf as Maisa
 Ahmed El Gezery as Saleh
 Mohamed Shawky as Madbouly
 Fatheya Chahine as Hani’s mother
 Ahmed Khamis

References

External links 

 

1981 films
1980s Arabic-language films
20th-century Egyptian films
Egyptian romantic drama films
Films shot in Egypt